Bronte Macaulay (born 9 January 1994) is an Australian professional surfer. She competes in the World Surf League.

Life 
Macaulay learned to surf along the coast of Western Australia when she was 9 years old. Her father, Dave Macaulay, who was an icon professional surfer in the 80's and 90's, taught surfing to Macaulay and her older twin sisters.

Career 
Macaulay was one spot short of qualifying for the Championship Tour in 2016 but was able to take the spot of Lakey Peterson after she was unable to continue after breaking her ankle. This gave her six shots against some of the world's top female surfers, and she beat Sally Fitzgibbons at Snapper, and Stephanie Gilmore and Johanne Defay at home in Margaret River. She became an official member of the Tour in 2017.

Career Highlights

Sponsors 
Macaulay's sponsors have included: Roxy, Dave Macaulay Surfboards, Electric, Creatures of Leisure, Sticky Feet

References

External links 
 Facebook

1994 births
Living people
People from the South West (Western Australia)
Sportswomen from Western Australia
Australian female surfers
World Surf League surfers